Veselin (Cyrillic script: Веселин) is a masculine given name of Slavic origin. It may refer to:

Veselin Beshevliev (1900–1992), Bulgarian historian and philologist
Veselin Bliznakov (born 1944), Bulgarian politician
Veselin Branimirov (born 1975), Bulgarian retired football defender
Veselin Čajkanović (1881–1946), Serbian classical and religious history scholar, Greek and Latin translator
Veselin Đoković (born 1976), Serbian/Montenegrin retired football player who is a manager
Veselin Đuho (born 1960), former water polo player and current coach from Croatia, twice Olympic gold medalist
Veselin Đuranović (1925–1997), communist politician from Montenegro
Veselin Đurasović (born 1957), former Bosnian football player, from the late 1970s and the 1980s
Veselin Ganev (born 1987), Bulgarian footballer
Veselin Jelušić, Serbian football manager who has managed a number of national teams in Africa, including Angola and Botswana
Veselin Marchev (born 1990), Bulgarian footballer
Veselin Marinov, Bulgarian singer
Veselin Masleša (1906–1943), Bosnian Serb writer, activist and Yugoslav Partisan
Veselin Matić (born 1960), Serbian professional basketball coach
Veselin Metodiev (born 1957), Bulgarian politician, member of Parliament & deputy chairman of Democrats for a Strong Bulgaria
Veselin Minev (born 1980), Bulgarian footballer
Veselin Misita (1904–1941), Serb military commander holding the rank of lieutenant colonel during World War II
Veselin Penev (born 1982), Bulgarian footballer, currently playing for Beroe Stara Zagora as a left-sided defender
Veselin Petrović (1929–1995), Serbian cyclist
Veselin Petrović (basketball) (born 1977), Serbian professional basketball player
Veselin Popović (born 1975), Serbian professional football player
Veselin Savić (born 1989), Serbian rower
Veselin Šljivančanin (born 1953), former Montenegrin officer in the Yugoslav People's Army
Veselin Stoyanov (1902–1969), Bulgarian composer
Veselin Stoykov (born 1986), Bulgarian footballer
Veselin Topalov (born 1975), Bulgarian chess grandmaster
Veselin Tsvetkovski (born 1989), Bulgarian footballer
Veselin Tzinzov (born 1986), Bulgarian cross country skier who has competed since 2004
Veselin Vachev (born 1973), former Bulgarian footballer
Veselin Velikov (born 1977), Bulgarian former footballer, and now manager
Veselin Vlahović, known as "Batko" or the "Monster of Grbavica" (born 1969), Montenegrin Serb war criminal
Veselin Vujović (born 1961), former Yugoslav handball player
Veselin Vukotić (criminal), Montenegrin criminal and hitman
Veselin Vuković (born 1958), former Yugoslav handball player

See also
Veselinov
Veselinović
Veselinovac

Slavic masculine given names
Bulgarian masculine given names
Croatian masculine given names
Macedonian masculine given names
Serbian masculine given names
Slovene masculine given names
Ukrainian masculine given names